Hetroertzen is a black metal band formed in 1997 by multi-instrumentalist Frater D. The group originated in Puerto Varas, Chile and by 2009 had relocated to Västerås, Sweden.

Biography 
Initially a solo project, Frater D. decided to make a full band and recruited guitarist Åskväder in September 1999. During their first ten years of existence, three albums were recorded and a handful of gigs were performed in their homeland of Chile. Various line-up changes occurred as well. 
 
The band had a brief hiatus for various reasons, but in 2009 after resurfacing in Sweden and the city of Västerås, Hetroertzen's next full-length album Exaltation of Wisdom, was recorded at the band's own studio. The line-up was then Frater D. on drums, bass and vocals and Åskväder on guitars. 
Exaltation of Wisdom was at first released on LP in 2010 by Lamech Records and was limited to 500 blood-numbered copies. In November 2011 the group performed Exaltation of Wisdom in its entirety in their most important performance thus far, an event called Arosian Black Mass, where the band received highly positive critique from attendants. The band had the help from Kfzl on bass and Garghuf on drums. After their live debut at Arosian Black Mass, some line-up changes occurred, and Anubis joined as guitarist.
 
At the beginning of 2012 Frater D., Åskväder and Anubis went on to record new material for what would be used for a split album together with Norwegian band Dødsengel. The split, titled Capax Infiniti, was positively received by fans and sold well.
In October 2013 the band went out on their first ever tour, alongside black metal acts Troll and Dødheimsgard. The tour was a success for the band and they won over new fans from all around Europe.
During 2014 Hetroertzen recorded material for a new full-length album. Ain Soph Aur was released in December 2014 receiving a great response from fans and the media. Ain Soph Aur was released on CD, vinyl and cassette through collaboration with Lamech Records, Terratur Possessions and Amor Fati Productions.
 
Ham played bass for Hetroertzen from 2015 to 2021.
In the fall of 2015, Hetroertzen visited the US for the first time and performed two exclusive shows in New York City and Baltimore along with Ominous Resurrection and their brethren LvxCaelis.
Also in 2015, the band confirmed to do a one-week tour in October along with French acts Malhkebre and Malepeste. The tour, named Exaltation, Revelation, Dereliction, reached different cities around France, Belgium, and the Netherlands.

Discography
 Flying Across the Misty Gardens - (2002)
 A Crimson Terrible Vision - (2003)
 Rex Averno - (2005)
 Exaltation of Wisdom - (2010)
 Capax Infiniti (split with Dødsengel) - (2013) 
 Ain Soph Aur - (2015)
Uprising of the Fallen - (2017)

Phosphorus Vol I - (2022)

References

External links

Lamech Records 
Facebook 

Chilean heavy metal musical groups
Musical groups established in 1997
1997 establishments in Chile
Black metal musical groups